Dave Strickler was an American drag racer during the 1960s.

His best friend, Martin Strand, taught him how to drive.

At the 1962 NHRA Winternationals at Pomona (headlined by Carol Cox), Strickler, driving the Ammon Smith-owned Chevrolet, lost to "Dyno Don" Nicholson in Stock Eliminator, 

At 1963's U.S. Nationals at Indianapolis Raceway Park, Strickler claimed Little Eliminator with a win over Jim Wangers,  In the early days, Strickler's engine builder was Bill "Grumpy" Jenkins, who prepared the A/FX 427 Chevy Strickler drove to the win.

Strickler visited Beeline Dragway in 1964, taking Top Stock at the AHRA Winter Nationals in a 1964 Dodge, 

Driving a 2 July 1965 match race at Charlotte Motor Speedway, in a 1965 Plymouth owned by Ronnie Sox, Strickler beat the Petty Enetrprises #43Jr. 1965 Plymouth Barracuda of Richard Petty,  in his brief foray into drag racing.

Strickler went to the 1970 NHRA World Finals at Dallas International Motor Speedway, where he was eliminated in round two by eventual Pro Stock winner Ronnie Sox. 

Some of Strickler's early cars were known as Old Reliable. 

For the 1971 Winternats, Strickler qualified #20, but did not race. 

Strickler died in 1985.

References

Year of birth missing
1985 deaths
Dragster drivers